Ohio's 22nd senatorial district has historically been based in north central Ohio. It now consists of the counties of Medina, Ashland, Richland, and a portion of Holmes County.  It encompasses Ohio House districts 2, 69 and 70.  It has a Cook PVI of R+6.  Its Ohio Senator is Republican Mark Romanchuk.

List of senators

References

External links
Ohio's 22nd district senator at the 130th Ohio General Assembly official website

Ohio State Senate districts